Celaenorrhinus toro, commonly known as the Toro sprite, is a species of butterfly in the family Hesperiidae. It is found in the Toro district, Uganda. The habitat consists of forests.

References

Endemic fauna of Uganda
Butterflies described in 1937
toro